Krasnoarmeysk is a town in Saratov Oblast, Russia, located  south of Saratov, the administrative center of the oblast. Population:

History
It was founded in 1764—1766 as the German colony of Baltser; the last name of one of the colonists. The other name of the colony was Goly Karamysh, after the river on which it was located. The "Karamysh" part in the river's name means muddy, silty, smudgy, while the "Goly" part alludes to the steppes and the lack of forests in the area; cf. Lesnoy Karamysh River (lit. the Karamysh River in the forests).

In the mid-19th century, the double name of Goly Karamysh (Balzer) was officially used, but it was shortened to just Baltser in 1926. Town status was granted in 1918. During World War II, the region was cleansed of German geographic names, with Baltser renamed Krasnoarmeysk (after the Red Army) in 1942.

Administrative and municipal status
Within the framework of administrative divisions, Krasnoarmeysk serves as the administrative center of Krasnoarmeysky District, even though it is not a part of it. As an administrative division, it is incorporated separately as Krasnoarmeysk Town Under Oblast Jurisdiction—an administrative unit with the status equal to that of the districts. As a municipal division, Krasnoarmeysk Town Under Oblast Jurisdiction is incorporated within Krasnoarmeysky Municipal District as Krasnoarmeysk Urban Settlement.

References

Notes

Sources

Е. М. Поспелов (Ye. M. Pospelov). "Имена городов: вчера и сегодня (1917–1992). Топонимический словарь." (City Names: Yesterday and Today (1917–1992). Toponymic Dictionary.) Москва, "Русские словари", 1993.

External links
Unofficial website of Krasnoarmeysk 

Cities and towns in Saratov Oblast
Saratov Governorate
Volga German people